Iron Springs is the historical name of a natural spring in the Whetstone Mountains of southeastern Arizona. It is famous for being the site of a confrontation between Wyatt Earp and William "Curly Bill" Brocius on March 24, 1882, which resulted in Brocius' death. The site was then known as Iron Springs, but on later maps the designation is Mescal Springs. 

This location is in Cochise County and should not be confused with the modern town of Iron Springs, Arizona in Yavapai County.

See also
Earp Vendetta Ride

References

Bodies of water of Cochise County, Arizona
Springs of Arizona